Otto Adam (24 November 1909 – 2 December 1977) was a German fencer. He won a bronze medal in the team foil event at the 1936 Summer Olympics.

References

1909 births
1977 deaths
German male fencers
Olympic fencers of Germany
Fencers at the 1936 Summer Olympics
Olympic bronze medalists for Germany
Olympic medalists in fencing
Medalists at the 1936 Summer Olympics
20th-century German people